Xara Designer Pro+ is an image editing program incorporating photo editing and vector illustration tools created by British software company Xara. Xara Xtreme LX was an early open source version for Linux.

The Windows version was previously sold under the names Xara Studio, Xara X and Xara Xtreme, and traces its origin in the late 1980s to a title called ArtWorks for the Acorn Archimedes line of computers using RISC OS.  There is a pro version called Xara Designer Pro (formerly Xara Xtreme Pro).

The current commercial version of Xara Photo & Graphic Designer runs only on Windows, although Xara documents can be edited in a web browser on any platform using the Xara Cloud service. Versions up to 4.x can be run on Linux using Wine.

History 

 ArtWorks, the predecessor of Xara Photo & Graphic Designer, was developed on the Acorn Archimedes and Risc PC 32-bit RISC computers running RISC OS by Computer Concepts Ltd in the late 1980s.
 The first version developed for Microsoft Windows was initially called Xara Studio, but before wide-scale public availability it was licensed to Corel Corporation, and from 1995 to 2000 was released as CorelXARA. Corel ceded the licensing rights back to Xara in 2000.
 The first version under the name Xara X was released in 2000 directly by its original owner.
 In 2004, the next version, Xara X¹, was released.
 Xara Xtreme was released in 2005.
 In October 2005, The Xara Group, Ltd. announced plans to open the source of Xara Xtreme under the GPL and to seek community help in porting it over to Linux and Mac OS X.
 In November 2006, an enhanced version of Xara Xtreme, Xara Xtreme PRO, was released.
 In May 2007, Xara Xtreme 3.2 and Xtreme Pro 3.2 were released. 3.2 Pro included Xara3D and both versions offered more robust typography features.
 In April 2008, Xara Xtreme 4.0 was released. Major features include extended text-area handling, tighter integration of bitmap handling and HTML export.
 In June 2009, Xara Xtreme and Xara Xtreme Pro 5.1 were released. Features included more text-area enhancements, content-aware scaling of bitmap images, improved file import and export, Master page (repeated) objects, an Object Gallery (replacing the Layer Gallery), website creation tools, and multi-stage graduated transparency.
 In June 2010, Xara Photo & Graphic Designer 6 and Xara Designer Pro 6 were released. Xtreme was renamed to Photo & Graphic Designer and Xtreme Pro was renamed to Designer Pro.
 In May 2011, Xara Photo & Graphic Designer 7 and Xara Designer Pro 7 were released. Features included 'magic' photo erase, user interface improvements to docking galleries and snapping alignment and (in Pro) new web page and website design features.
 In May 2012, Xara Photo & Graphic Designer 2013 and Xara Designer Pro X (v8) were released.
 In May 2013, Xara Photo & Graphic Designer 9 was released.
 In July 2013, Xara Designer Pro X9 was released. New or upgraded tools for photo healing, background erase and masking. Special effects plugins. Web authoring gets improved tools for background handling, embedding of fonts and handling of high-res images for high resolution displays on mobile units. Page layout tools now have support for Google fonts, automatic end-of-document page creation, multi-column text boxes, web documents and import of docx-files.
 In July 2014 (16 July), Xara Photo & Graphic Designer 10 was released. and (23 July) Xara Designer Pro X10 was released.
 In June 2015 (29 June), Xara Photo & Graphic Designer 11 was released. and in July 2015 Xara Designer Pro X11 was released.
 In 2016, the delivery model was changed to an Update Service, which can be renewed annually. Users are entitled to any updates released while the Update Service is active. The first Update Service updates were in May 2016 for Xara Photo & Graphic Designer and July 2016 for Xara Designer Pro X.
 The most recent Update Service releases were in October 2018.

Features 
Xara Photo & Graphic Designer is known for its usability and fast renderer. It provides a fully anti-aliased display, advanced gradient fill, and transparency tools.

Among vector editors, Xara Photo & Graphic Designer is considered to be fairly easy to learn, with similarities to CorelDRAW and Inkscape in terms of interface. Alongside the vector illustration tools, Xara Photo & Graphic Designer also includes an integrated photo tool offering manual and automatic photo enhance, cropping, adjustment of brightness levels, red-eye fix, 'magic' erase, photo healing, color and background erase, panoramas and content aware resizing. Designer Pro includes a wider range of tools for other design tasks including the creation of web pages and websites, and text and page layout tools for DTP with the aim of providing a single solution for all graphic and web design tasks.

See also 
 .xar file format
 Comparison of vector graphics editors
 Comparison of raster-to-vector conversion software

References

External links 
 
 XaraXone.com: Xara Xtreme, Photo & Graphic Designer and Designer Pro tutorials
 TalkGraphics.com: Xara user forums
 Top Ten Reviews comparison of drawing software
 PC Pro review of Xara Photo & Graphic Designer 10
 Expert Reviews (Computer Shopper) review of Xara Photo & Graphic Designer 11

Graphics software
Vector graphics editors
Raster to vector conversion software
Raster graphics editors
Desktop publishing software
Web design
1995 software
Windows graphics-related software